Gerard Horenbout (c. 1465–c. 1541) was a Flemish miniaturist, a late example of the miniature tradition in Early Netherlandish painting. He is "likely and widely accepted" to be the Master of James IV of Scotland.

Biography
Horenbout lived and worked in Ghent and is best known as a manuscript illustrator. He also made stained glass, tapestries, embroidery designs, ironworks and panel painting. First mentioned in 1487, when he joined the painters Guild of Saint Luke. He was married to Margaret Svanders soon after joining the guild. They had six children, two of whom were the artists Lucas Horenbout and Susanna Hornebolt. There were also sons Eloy and Joris. Lucas, Susanna and at least one more of his sons were trained by Horenbout to be painters.

He had at least two apprentices, one in 1498, and one in 1502. In 1515, he was made painter to Archduchess Margaret of Austria, and also briefly worked at the court of Henry VIII in England. He was visited by Albrecht Dürer in 1521, when Dürer bought an illustrated manuscript made by his daughter Susanna Horenbout. His son Lucas Horenbout was also a well-known painter.

His wife, Margaret Svanders, or van Saunders, died in 1529 and he made the brass plaque found at All Saints' Church in Fulham, London.

He died about 1540 or 1541.

Works
Miniatures in the Breviary of Eleanor of Portugal, ca. 1500
Miniatures in the Hours of James IV of Scotland, between 1502 and 1503
16 miniatures in the Sforza Hours for Archduchess Margaret of Austria, between 1517 and 1520 (now in the British Library)
Miniatures in the Grimani Breviary, before 1520
Portraits of Lieven Van Pottelsberghe and Livina Van Steelant, c. 1525, in the Museum of Fine Arts, Ghent

Notes

References

1465 births
1541 deaths
Flemish Renaissance painters
Manuscript illuminators
Painters from Ghent